The Nova Scotia Tankard is the Nova Scotia provincial championship for men's curling. The tournament is run by the Nova Scotia Curling Association. The winner represents Team Nova Scotia at the Tim Hortons Brier.  

Previously, it was known as the Johnson Cup (1927-1939); British Consols (1940-1979), the Labatt Tankard, Keith's Tankard, Molson Scotia Cup, Molson Coors Tankard (2013-2014), Clearwater Men's Provincial Championship (2015), the East Coast Credit Union Tankard (2016) and the Deloitte Tankard (2017–2020).

Winners

References

External links
Our Champions - Nova Scotia Curling Association
Nova Scotia Men's Champions

The Brier provincial tournaments
Curling competitions in Nova Scotia